Gianmatteo Vittorio Fernan Guidicelli (born March 26, 1990), known professionally as Matteo Guidicelli, is a Filipino actor, model, singer and former kart racer.

Early life and career 

Matteo Guidicelli was born in Cebu City. He is one of three children of Gianluca Guidicelli, an Italian, and Glenna Fernan, a Filipino. His maternal grandfather is the late Cebu Provincial Prosecutor Vicente “Inting” Fernan, cousin of then Senator and Chief Justice Marcelo Fernan making him Guidicelli's great-uncle.

Guidicelli initially became known through his racing career, having started at an early age of 11. He has won numerous awards including being a three-time winner of the Karter of the Year award.

Guidicelli took an interest in acting after taking workshops at the New York Academy.  As soon as he came back to the Philippines, he took theatre courses at Brent International School and began to participate in plays. He also attended Columbia College in Chicago for two years to pursue a B.A. in performing arts in the field of musical theater.

Acting
Guidicelli's acting career started when he joined the fourth season of the teenage comedy sitcom Go Kada Go in 2007, becoming a member of ABS-CBN's Star Magic.  The next year, he played supporting roles in the action fantasy show Kung Fu Kids and in the soap opera Ligaw na Bulaklak. He used to be a regular on SOP Fully Charged along with a guest role in All My Life as part of his transfer to GMA Network. In 2010, he returned to ABS-CBN through the primetime fantasy television series Agua Bendita, where he was given a major role.

In 2011, Guidicelli became one of the hosts of the noon-time variety game show Happy Yipee Yehey!, and was cast to play Trevor Wu, one of Kim Chiu's leading men in My Binondo Girl, a TV show shot in Manila and Hong Kong, and released internationally.  2011 also marked the year Guidicelli was cast in his first film, Catch Me, I'm in Love.

He landed his first lead role in 2012, starring as the lovestruck Carlo in the successful indie film, My Cactus Heart.

Apart from acting, Guidicelli also pursued a career in singing. In 2011, Star Records released Guidicelli's first single "Someone Like You" as an Internet download.  On January 17, 2016, he launched his first self-titled album Matteo Guidicelli under the same recording company.

He played a lead role in the romantic show Dolce Amore, which debuted on February 15, 2016.

After 13 years of being with Star Magic, Guidicelli signed a contract with Viva Artists Agency.

Military
Guidicelli is a reservist in the Philippine Army as a 2nd Lieutenant of the Armed Forces of the Philippines. He has undergone rigorous training with the elite Philippine Scout ranger Regiment. The AFP confirmed that he was treated the same way as any other trainee.

Personal life
In November 2019, Matteo got engaged to his long time girlfriend Sarah Geronimo; they got secretly married in a Christian Wedding Ceremony at Victory Church, The Fort past six in the evening, Thursday night on February 20, 2020. Senior Pastor Paulo Punzalan officiated the ceremony.

Filmography

Film

Television

Discography 

 Matteo Guidicelli (2015)
 Hey (2017)

Awards and nominations

References

External links

1990 births
Living people
Filipino television personalities
Filipino television presenters
Filipino male models
Filipino people of Italian descent
Star Magic
ABS-CBN personalities
GMA Network personalities
Viva Artists Agency
TV5 (Philippine TV network) personalities
People from Cebu City
Male actors from Cebu
Filipino film actors
Filipino male television actors
21st-century Filipino actors
21st-century Filipino male singers
Filipino television variety show hosts
Kart racing
Cebuano people of Italian descent
Cebuano male models
21st-century Cebuano male singers